Enyinnaya is both a given name and surname. Notable people with the name include:

Hugo Enyinnaya (born 1981), Nigerian footballer
Loveday Enyinnaya (born 1989), Nigerian footballer
Enyinnaya Abaribe (born 1955), Nigerian politician

Surnames of Nigerian origin